Þorsteinn frá Hamri (aka Þorsteinn Jónsson), (15 Mar 1938 – 28 Jan 2018) was an Icelandic writer notable for having been nominated five times for the Nordic Council's Literature Prize over a period of 35 years.

Writings
Since his first book of poems released in the 1950s, Þorsteinn frá Hamri had published seventeen volumes of poetry and six of prose fiction by 2000.

References

See also
 Þorsteinn Jonsson entry in Dennis McIntire, International Who's Who in Poetry and Poets' Encyclopaedia, Routledge, 2001, pp. 270–271.
 Hermann Stefánsson (Transl. Dagur Gunnarsson), 'The clamour of elves and the magic of birds – On the writings of Þorsteinn frá Hamri', Reykjavík City Library, 2002.

Bibliography

Novels, short stories and sagnaþættir (chronicles)
 1963 – Skuldaskil (The Reckoning)
 1969 – Himinbjargarsaga eða Skógardraumur (The Story of Himinbjörg or a Forest Dream) – nominated for 1972 Nordic Council Literature Prize
 Haust í Skírisskógi (Autumn in Sherwood Forest)
 Hallgrímur smali og húsfreyjan á bjargi, (Hallgrímur the sheaphearder and the housekeeper at Bjarg)
 1987 – Ætternisstapi og átján vermenn (The ancestral home and eighteen sailors)
 1989 – Vatns götur og blóðs (Streets of Water and Blood) – nominated for 1992 Nordic Council Literature Prize

Poetry
 1958 – Í svörtum kufli (In a black cassock)
 1960 – Tannfé handa nýjum heimi (Tooth fee for a New World)
 1962 – Lifandi manna land (Land of living men)
 1964 – Langnætti á Kaldadal (A long night in Kaldidalur (cold valley))
 1972 – Veðrahjálmur (Weather helmet)
 1977 – Fiðrið úr sæng daladrottningar (The feathers from the valley queen's duvet) – nominated for 1979 Nordic Council Literature Prize
 1982 – Spjótalög á spegil (Spearthrusted mirror) – nominated for 1984 Nordic Council Literature Prize
 1992 – Sæfarinn sofandi (The sleeping sailor)
 Það talar í trjánum (Speaking in the trees)
 Vetrarmyndin (Winter image)
 1999 – Medan pu vaktir

Prizes and awards
 1972 – short list – Nordic Council Literature Prize for the novel Himinbjargarsaga eða Skógardraumur.
 1979 – short list – Nordic Council Literature Prize for the poetry collection Fiðrið úr sæng Daladrottningar.
 1981 – Children's book literary award for translation, Reykjavík
 1984 – short list – Nordic Council Literature Prize for the poetry collection Spjótalög á spegil.
 1991 – Thorbergur Thordarson Literary Prize
 1992 – short list – Nordic Council Literature Prize for the poetry collection Vatns götur og blóðs.
 1992 – Icelandic Literary Prize
 2015 – short list – Nordic Council Literature Prize for the poetry collection Skessukatlar.

External links
 The Nordic Council's Literature Prize
 https://bokmenntaborgin.is/en/literature-web/author/thorsteinn-fra-hamri Biography of Þorsteinn frá Hamri at Reykjavík City Library]
 An image of the writer and example of his work (In Icelandic)

See also
 Icelandic literature

Þorsteinn Fra Hamri
1938 births
Living people